For the fly genus of the same name, see Evocoa.

Ocoa ochromimoides is a species of beetle in the family Cerambycidae, and the only species in the genus Ocoa. It was described by Lane in 1970.

References

Hemilophini
Beetles described in 1970